Homer protein homolog 2 is a protein that in humans is encoded by the HOMER2 gene.

This gene encodes a member of the homer family of dendritic proteins. Members of this family regulate group 1 metabotrophic glutamate receptor function. The encoded protein may be involved in cell growth. Four transcript variants encoding distinct isoforms have been identified for this gene.

Interactions
HOMER2 has been shown to interact with RYR1.

See also
 HOMER1
 HOMER3

References

Further reading